Benedict Peters is a Nigerian billionaire who founded the Aiteo Group, Nigeria's largest indigenous oil producing firm. As of November 2014, he had an estimated net worth of US$2.7 billion. He is ranked by Ventures Africa as the 17th richest person in Africa and the 7th richest in Nigeria.

Early life and development
Peters hails from Onicha Oloma in Delta state and was born in Abakaliki, Ebonyi State to a banker and a homemaker. He attended Ekulu Primary School, Enugu and Federal Government College Enugu, after which he proceeded to University of Benin, where he obtained a Bachelor of Science (B.Sc) Hons degree in Geography and Town Planning.

Career
Peters began his career in the oil and gas industry in the early 1990s, working with the founders of Ocean and Oil, the entity now known as Oando Nigeria Plc, Adewale Tinubu, Mofe Boyo and Onajite Okoloko. He moved to MRS Oil Nigeria PLC as Group Executive Director, ending as its Managing Director, before leaving in 1999 to establish Sigmund Communecci.

In February 2008, Peters founded the Aiteo group (Aiteo Eastern Exploration and Production Company Limited), the successor entity to Sigmund Communecci. The company owns one of the largest petroleum tank farms in Nigeria with facilities in excess of over 250 million litres on over 100,000 square meters of landmass It also owns and operates the Abonnema Storage Terminal.

In 2014, Aiteo  acquired a controlling stake in Oil Mining Lease (OML) 29 and the Nembe Creek Trunk Line (NCTL) in the Eastern Niger Delta from Royal Dutch Shell Plc. According to Wood Mackenzie, "OML 29 is a large block located in the southeastern Niger Delta. It contains 11 oil and gas fields". "The 983-square-kilometre OML 29, onshore in the Niger Delta region, is the site of Nigeria's first-ever commercial discovery", in 1956 at the Oloibiri Oilfield.

Peters is also rapidly diversifying with his founding of Aiteo Power, of which he is chairman. He leads the Aiteo Consortium and EMA Consortium which has won separate bids to acquire three power generating companies and is set to build a 100,000 barrel refinery in oil-rich Warri in Delta State.

In April 2017, Aiteo Group announced the signing of a five-year partnership agreement with the Nigeria Football Federation worth an estimated N2.9b. In the capacity of Official Optimum Partner of the NFF, Aiteo's support funded the salaries of Super Eagles boss Gernot Rohr and coaches of all NFF's national teams. Peters told the media that "Aiteo Group is as passionate about leadership as Nigerians are about football, so we are proud to be working together with the NFF and its coaching staff to reach a shared goal of a more prosperous Nigeria".

Awards

On August 5, 2014 in Washington DC, Peters was one of four recipients of the Marquee Award for Global Business Excellence at the Africa-US Leadership Awards dinner, hosted by African Energy Association, "a non-profit organization of experienced negotiators, advisors and high-level energy advocates". Leadership, an Abuja, Nigeria based national newspaper, named him the "Leadership CEO of the Year 2014" for championing a local content deal facilitating a greater capacity to manage oil assets in his native country, Nigeria. On 18 January 2015, Peters was given the Dr. Martin Luther King Jr. Legacy Awards in the "Economic Empowerment" category in an event held in Washington, DC's Willard Hotel. Benedict Peters was listed among the 50 Most Influential Nigerians in 2017 by BusinessDay Newspaper in Nigeria. In June 2018, he was also named by The Guardian (Nigeria) as Oil and Gas CEO of the Year. Business Day's Man of the year 2019

Personal life
Peters is married and has four children. In 2017 the Supreme Court of Nigeria in Abuja ordered the immediate lift of an Interim Forfeiture Order on Peters properties in the UK. The Interim Forfeiture Order was obtained by the Economic and Financial Crimes Commission EFCC. The court accused the EFCC of "gross misstatements, concealment and misrepresentation of facts".

Benedict Peters was accused in the Pandora Papers leak of bribing a Nigerian oil official (Diezani Alison-Madueke) with overseas luxury real-estate in order to secure favors with the Nigerian Ministry of Petroleum Resources. Benedict has denied the allegations.

References 

Nigerian billionaires
1966 births
Living people
Federal Government College Enugu alumni
University of Benin (Nigeria) alumni